The siege of Golconda was a siege of Golconda Fort between the Qutb Shahi dynasty and the Mughal Emperor Aurangzeb, occuring in January 1687, lasting 8 months. The fort was home of the Kollur Mine. The Golconda Fort was considered to be an impregnable fort on the Indian subcontinent. At the end of the siege, Aurangzeb and the Mughals entered Golconda victorious.

Command
After conquering two Muslim kingdoms, the Nizamshahis of Ahmednagar and the Adilshahis of Bijapur, the Mughal Emperor Aurangzeb assembled an army and began his siege on Golconda Fort. Aurangzeb assigned Mir Jumla who had previously served to Golconda until 1655 and later joined the Mughals.

Ghaziuddin Khan Siddiqi Firuz Jang, son of Khwaja Abid Siddiqi Kilich Khan and father of Nizam I of Hyderabad, Qamaruddin Khan Siddiqi, was assigned to bombard the walls of the fort using almost 100 cannons.

The Mughal admiral Munnawar Khan was assigned to deliver food and weapons to the besieging Mughal army. The general Dilir Khan was assigned to command the Matchlock Sepoys that tried to penetrate the defenses of Golconda Fort. While Shaista Khan, Murshid Quli Khan and Ibrahim Khan commanded the rest of the army and it's reserves around Golconda Fort and throughout all the Qutb Shahi territory.

Siege
As the Qutb Shahi ruler of Golconda, Abul Hasan Qutb Shah refused to surrender to the Mughals, and he and his servicemen fortified themselves at Golconda Fort, and fiercely protected the Kollur Mine, which was then the world's only diamond mine at that time. His most experienced Golconda commander, Muqarrab Khan, defected to the Mughals. The Qutb Shahis had constructed massive fortifications throughout successive generations on a granite hill over 400 feet high with an enormous 8-mile wall enclosing the city. The main gates of Golconda was able to repulse any war elephant attack, as they had iron spikes on the gates to damage the advancing Mughal elephants.

In January 1687, Aurangzeb led his Mughal army against the Deccan Qutb Shahi ruler taking refuge in Golconda Fort. Aurangzeb had surrounded Golconda Fort and alongside about 100 cannons began siege operations. In order to breach the granite walls of Golconda Fort, Firuz Jang was appointed to utilize the massive Rahban, Fateh Rahber and the cannon known as the Azhdaha-Paikar (python body). It had the ability to shoot cannonballs weighing over 50 kg. In response to the Mughal bombardment, Abul Hasan Qutb Shah fired from his high-vicinity mortar called the Pata Burj. According to Saqi Mustad Khan, bamboo rockets were also utilized day and night on Mughal encampments.

Meanwhile, due to heavy rains, the Manjera River overflooded and the scarcity of food supplies became a severe complication, leading to the deaths of many animals and caused malnourished troops to get ill. Fearing a possible counterattack organized from the fort, Aurangzeb ordered the construction of a fortified position made of wood and mud, which would house and organize Mughal attacking parties.

The intense cannon fire from Golconda Fort against the approaching Mughals eventually caused the death of the experienced Mughal commander Kilich Khan Khwaja Abid Siddiqi. Aurangzeb was furthermore grieved by the death of his long-time commander Gaziuddin Khan Siddiqi Bahadur Firuz Jang, who died of natural causes.

At night, the Mughal Emperor Aurangzeb and his infantry of assembled and erected scaffolding that allowed them to scale the high walls. Aurangzeb also ordered his men to throw huqqa (grenades) while scaling the fortified wall and were reinforced by matchlocks and composite bows. While most of these attacks remained largely unsuccessful, they managed to demoralize the defenders of Golconda Fort. During the eight-month siege the Mughals faced small-scale famines, often for weeks at a time. Whenever the Mughal Admiral Munnawar Khan arrived with supplies and weapons with his river fleet, Aurangzeb would intensify the siege.

While the Qutb Shahis maintained strong efforts defending their walls, the siege overwhelmed the officials in service of the Qutb Shahis. Sarandaz Khan revealed a back door that led into the fort and opened the gates that allows the Aurangzeb's army to enter.

The Mughal army, led by Ghazi ud-Din Khan Feroze Jung I, the son of the fallen Kilich Khan Khwaja Abid Siddiqi, was among the first to enter the gates. He immediately charged towards the citadel of Abul Hasan Qutb Shah, eventually taking him prisoner by surprise. Firuz Jang and his forces occupied Kollur Mine and the Mughal reserves, disarmed the defenders of the fort and paved their way for the entry of victorious Mughal Emperor Aurangzeb. Golconda Fort was later repaired and armed with superior cannons. Shaista Khan is known to have spared the Qutb Shahi servicemen. The ruler of Golconda, Abul Hasan Qutb Shah, however, was imprisoned in Daulatabad Fort by the orders of the Mughal Emperor Aurangzeb.

Aftermath
The Mughal Emperor Aurangzeb and his army managed to penetrate the walls by capturing a gate. This resulted in the Qutb Shahis of Golconda and the ruler Abul Hasan Qutb Shah surrendering peacefully and handing over the Nur-Ul-Ain Diamond, Great Stone Diamond, Kara Diamond, Darya-e-Nur, the Hope Diamond, the Wittelsbach Diamond and the Regent Diamond. The Golconda Sultanate was incorporated as a subah, or province of the Mughal Empire, called Hyderabad Subah.

References

Golconda
Golconda
History of Telangana
1687 in India